The 1979–80 Sussex County Football League season was the 55th in the history of Sussex County Football League a football competition in England.

Division One

Division One featured 14 clubs which competed in the division last season, along with two new clubs, promoted from Division Two:
Pagham
Portfield

Also, Steyning changed name to Steyning Town.

League table

Division Two

Division Two featured twelve clubs which competed in the division last season, along with two new clubs relegated from Division One:
East Grinstead
Sidley United

League table

References

1979-80
1979–80 in English football leagues